Witold Sabela (born 8 August 1981 in Łódź) is a Polish former professional footballer player who played as a goalkeeper.

Career

Club
In July 2011, he joined GKS Katowice.

References

External links
 

1981 births
Living people
Polish footballers
ŁKS Łódź players
Mławianka Mława players
Tur Turek players
Odra Wodzisław Śląski players
GKS Katowice players
Ekstraklasa players
Polish expatriate footballers
Association football goalkeepers
Footballers from Łódź
Expatriate footballers in Germany
Polish expatriate sportspeople in Germany